Kieran Claffey (15 April 1949 – 19 September 1995) was an Irish Gaelic footballer who played for club sides Doon and Clontibret O'Neills. He was also a member of the Offaly senior football team.

Career

Claffey never played Gaelic football in organised competitions at primary or secondary school level. As an agricultural college student in Monaghan he joined the Clontibret O'Neills club and won a Monaghan SFC title in 1968. Claffey later returned to the Doon club and won an Offaly JFC title in 1970.

Claffey, having never lined out in the minor grade, first played for Offaly as a member of the under-21 team in 1970. By this stage, Claffey had already joined the senior team. He partnered Willie Bryan at midfield when Offaly beat Galway in the 1971 All-Ireland final. Claffey's inter-county career ended in 1975, by which stage he had also won two Leinster SFC medals.

Death

Claffey died from a kidney-related illness on 19 September 1995, at the age of 46.

Honours

Clontibret O'Neill's
Monaghan Senior Football Championship: 1968

Doon
Offaly Junior A Football Championship: 1970

Offaly
All-Ireland Senior Football Championship: 1971
Leinster Senior Football Championship: 1969, 1971, 1973

References

External link

 Kieran Claffey appearance record

1949 births
1995 deaths
Offaly inter-county Gaelic footballers